The 2021 AFL Women's season was the fifth season of the AFL Women's competition, the highest level senior Australian rules football competition in Australia. The season featured fourteen clubs, ran from 28 January until 17 April, and comprised a 9-game home-and-away season followed by a finals series featuring the top six clubs.

Format
The previous two AFLW seasons were formatted with the assistance of conferences, which split the league's clubs into two ranking tables. The AFL elected to remove the conferences for the 2021 season and revert to a single ladder. Under the terms of the existing contractual bargaining agreement between the players and the AFL, teams will play nine regular season matches, before a three-week finals series for the top six teams occurs. Owing to the fact clubs will not get the opportunity to play all of their opponents once, the AFL placed the teams together in a single 2020 ladder and then broke them up into brackets to attempt a fair fixture for the 2021 season.

The season was played during the second year of the COVID-19 pandemic. As the season began, Australia had largely settled into a paradigm of most states maintaining zero COVID-19 cases outside of their international travel quarantine systems; this allowed football games to be played in front of crowds, usually with reduced capacity, and unhindered interstate travel was permitted without quarantine. However, the different state governments often responded quickly to small numbers or even single virus cases being discovered in the community; this meant border restrictions or quarantine periods were at times re-introduced at short notice, impacting interstate travel for games; and, in some cases, that city- or state-wide lockdowns could be imposed within the impacted states, precluding football activities altogether. The season's original nine-round fixture was discarded due to such restrictions after only one week, in favour of a floating fixture released around any restrictions in place at the time.

Premiership season
 All starting times are local times.

Round 1

Round 2

Round 3

Round 4

Round 5

Round 6

Round 7

Round 8

Round 9

Win/loss table

Bold – Home game
Opponent for round listed above margin
This table can be sorted by margin, winners are represented in the first half of each column, and losers are represented in the second half of each column once sorted

Ladder

Ladder progression
Numbers highlighted in green indicates the team finished the round inside the top 6.
Numbers highlighted in blue indicates the team finished in first place for that round.	
Numbers highlighted in red indicates the team finished in last place for that round.

Finals series

Qualifying finals

Preliminary finals

Grand Final

Awards

League awards
AFLW Players Association awards:
The AFLW Coaches Association awards:
Brianna Davey was named captain of the All-Australian team. Twelve of the fourteen clubs had at least one representative in the 21-woman team.

Best and fairests

Leading goalkickers
Numbers highlighted in blue indicates the player led the season's goal kicking tally at the end of that round.

Source:

Coach changes

Club leadership

Notes

References

External links
 Official AFL Women's website

2021 AFL Women's season
AFL Women's seasons
AFL Women's season